Sphingopyxis alaskensis is a bacterium from the genus of Sphingopyxis which has been isolated from seawater from Alaska.

References

Sphingomonadales
Bacteria described in 2001